Amphilius lampei is a species of catfish in the genus Amphilius. It is found in tributaries of the Shebelle River near Harar. Its length reaches 10 cm.

References

lampei
Fish of Ethiopia
Freshwater fish of East Africa